Eric Nelson Shook is a game designer.

Career
Eric Shook is a graphic designer and author. Shook was an old friend of Gary Gygax, and began with TSR in the Dungeon Hobby Shop. When Gygax was expanding Greyhawk in the early 1980s, he brought Shook and Rob Kuntz in to help him manage the project.

Shook was later the Vice President of Kuntz's Pied Piper Publishing.

References

External links
 

Dungeons & Dragons game designers
Living people
Place of birth missing (living people)
Year of birth missing (living people)